Golden Dreams (translit. Khab-ha-ye Talayi) is a 1951 Iranian comedy film directed by Moezzodivan Fekri.

Cast
 Iran Daftari 
 Moezzodivan Fekri 
 Ahmad Ghadakchian 
 Majid Mohseni 
 Shahla Riahi

References

Bibliography 
 Mohammad Ali Issari. Cinema in Iran, 1900-1979. Scarecrow Press, 1989.

External links 
 

1951 films
Iranian comedy films
1950s Persian-language films
Films directed by Moezzodivan Fekri
1951 comedy films
Iranian black-and-white films